Owen LeFranc Beck (born 31 May 1976), nicknamed "What the Heck Beck," is a Jamaican former professional boxer who challenged for the WBA heavyweight title in 2006. He had an amateur record of 73 wins and 5 losses.

Career
Known as Owen "What the Heck" Beck, Beck began his career in 1998 by winning his first 24 fights, but all against limited opposition, the best being amateur star Derrell Dixon and undefeated Taurus Sykes.

This streak and a contract with Don King set up a WBC & IBF Heavyweight Title Eliminator bout against heavyweight contender Monte Barrett in 2005, and Beck was TKO'd in the 9th.

Since the loss, Beck has lost to Ray Austin, but beat cruiser journeyman Darnell Wilson to set up a shot against the former WBA Heavyweight Title holder Nikolay Valuev. Valuev defeated Beck, dropping him twice and winning via TKO in the 3rd. After he fought Valuev he made a comeback and won the fight against Ricardo Arce via 2nd Round technical knockout and had another fight against Marvin Hunt and beat him via first-round knockout.

He took a 19-month break from boxing before returning to the ring in June 2009.

He fought Andrew Greeley and won the match by split decision on 13 June 2009.

He fought Jermell Barnes on 21 August 2009 in a fight which he won by unanimous decision with the scores of 79-73, 77-75 and 80-72 all in favor of Beck. Also in late 2009 Owen enlisted a new trainer Clinton Barnes.

On 16 January 2010, Beck fought Manuel Charr and was TKO'ed in the tenth and final round with 16 seconds left on the clock.

On 16 April, Beck fought Tony Thompson in Memphis, Tennessee, and was knocked out at 2-minutes and 50-seconds of the 4th round.

Professional boxing record

External links
 

Heavyweight boxers
Living people
1976 births
Jamaican male boxers
People from Westmoreland Parish